The Battle of Mukandwara Pass, also known as Monson's Retreat (8–10 July 1804) was fought between forces of the Indore Maharaja Yashwantrao Holkar, an ally of the Maratha Empire and British East India Company forces under Colonel William Monson during the Second Anglo-Maratha War. Monson, having overextended his supply line, was retreating toward Kotah when Holkar's forces decimated his rear guard on 10 July. Monson reached Kotah on 12 July, but was forced to abandon his guns in the mud at the Chambal River on the 15th. Holkar continued to harass Monson's force, which reached Kushalgarh on 25 Aug. Monson's men were then in a panic as they barely made it to Bayana.

"Monson's loss had been heavy.  Twelve British officers had been killed, two were drowned and two were missing.  Five other officers were wounded.  Half of the five...battalions had been lost.  Monson's retreat shook British military reputation and prestige to the core."

References

 MacFarlane, Charles.  A History of British India: From the Earliest English Intercourse to the Present Time
 Dorman, Mark Robert Phipps.  A History of the British Empire in the Nineteenth Century, Volume 1
 Mehta, J. L. Advanced Studies in the history of modern India, 1707–1813

Conflicts in 1804
1804 in India
Battles of the Second Anglo-Maratha War
Battles involving the British East India Company
Battles involving the Maratha Empire
July 1804 events